The Novo River is a river of Santa Catarina state in southeastern Brazil. It merges with the Humboldt River to form the Itapoçu River.

See also
List of rivers of Santa Catarina

References

Rivers of Santa Catarina (state)